Kevin Elliot Pollak (born October 30, 1957) is an American actor, comedian, impressionist and podcast host. He has appeared in over 80 films; his roles include Sam Weinberg in Rob Reiner's legal film A Few Good Men, Jacob Goldman in Grumpy Old Men and its sequel Grumpier Old Men; Todd Hockney in The Usual Suspects, Phillip Green in Martin Scorsese's Casino, and Bobby Chicago in End of Days.

From 2016 to 2022, the actor played a recurring role in Better Things. Since 2017, Pollak has been a regular cast member on The Marvelous Mrs. Maisel on Amazon.

Early life
Pollak was born on October 30, 1957 in San Francisco, California. He is the younger son of Elaine Harlow and Robert Pollak. He has one older brother, Craig, who lives in San Jose, California. He attended high school at Pioneer High School in San Jose. Pollak was raised in Reform Judaism.

Career

Acting

As an actor, Pollak's roles include the best friend or confidant characters to the leading men, as he did in Ricochet (1991), A Few Good Men (1992), End of Days (1999), and The Wedding Planner (2001). However, he has also played a wide variety of parts, such as a comical brownie in Willow (1988), a criminal in The Usual Suspects (1995),  the philandering brother of Sarah Jessica Parker in Miami Rhapsody (1995), and a gangster in The Whole Nine Yards (2000). He also briefly hosted Celebrity Poker Showdown in its first season. His most substantial role to date was in Deterrence (1999), in which he played the main character, a vice president who must take over for a deceased President and deal with a nuclear crisis.

In December 2006, he played Karl Kreutzfeld in the Sci Fi Channel miniseries The Lost Room. Through 2008, he had a recurring role as a district attorney on the television series Shark.  In March 2008, Pollak played himself in the web series The Writers Room on Crackle.  In 2010, he portrayed Sheriff Tom Wagner in Choose.

In January 2010, Pollak was scheduled to host Our Little Genius on FOX, but the series was pulled before it could air on television. Pollak was then seen hosting Million Dollar Money Drop for FOX at the end of 2010; the show ran for 12 episodes.

In 2014, Pollak began a recurring role as Alvin Biletnikoff on the CBS sitcom Mom. His time on the show ended with the death of his character.

Starting in 2016, Pollak played the role of Marion in the FX series Better Things. His character was recurring throughout all five seasons.

In 2017, Pollak joined the cast of the Golden Globe–winning The Marvelous Mrs. Maisel, an original series from Amazon, as Moishe Maisel, the main character's father-in-law.

In 2019, Pollak appeared in five episodes of the fourth season on Showtime's Billions, as Douglas Mason.

Directing
Pollak's directorial debut was on the horror web series Vamped Out, featured on the internet television platform Babelgum. Jason Antoon, Seana Kofoed, Samm Levine and Pollak all acted in the ensemble cast. The screenbook was based on a simple joke that Antoon and Pollak had between them. Most recently, Pollak's feature film directorial debut, the comedy documentary Misery Loves Comedy, premiered at the 2015 Sundance Film Festival. The film sold North American rights to Tribeca Film, a US distribution company.

Pollak directed the comedy film The Late Bloomer, starring Johnny Simmons, which was released in 2016.

Stand-up
As a comedian, Pollak's most famous work was his 1991 HBO special Stop with the Kicking, directed by fellow comedian David Steinberg and produced by comedy writer Martin Olson. In July 2010, The Littlest Suspect, his most recent comedy special, was aired on Showtime. Comedy Central named Kevin one of the Top 100 Comedians of All Time.

Celebrity impressions

Podcasting
In April 2009, Pollak partnered with Jason Calacanis on a weekly Internet talk show, Kevin Pollak's Chat Show. Guests for the show include film directors Kevin Smith and Mike Binder, comedians Jimmy Pardo and Bill Burr, and actors Nia Vardalos, Illeana Douglas, Bryan Cranston, Dana Carvey, Matthew Perry, Jon Hamm, Paul Rudd, Adam Carolla, Anthony Cumia, Jason Alexander, Seth MacFarlane, Tom Hanks, Larry David and Jason Lee.

The guest interviews are very in-depth and typically longer than an hour in duration, sometimes exceeding two hours. Common topics include the guests' childhoods, how they got into the business they are in (typically show business), how they got inspired to start certain creative endeavors, and unique experiences they have had while working. Viewers can interact via chat room during the show, and sometimes questions for the guest posed in the chat room are answered live.

The show's self-described "Paul Shaffer" is actor Samm Levine.

Recurring segments and bits on the show include:
 "The Larry King Game", which requires the guest to do a bad Larry King impression, reveal something about oneself (in the persona of Larry King) and then go to the phones and say a funny-sounding city
 "Tweet Five," where Pollak reads the guest five questions from a Twitter user, usually in a this-or-that style
 "Who Tweeted", in which a host (typically Samm Levine) reads tweets from the Twitter accounts of three female celebrities (the list of actresses varies, but typically includes Demi Moore (or, more recently, Justin Bieber), Tyra Banks, and Paris Hilton) and Pollak and his guest compete against each other game-show-style to guess who authored each tweet.
 "You're Not Buffering", in which Pollak freezes mid-statement during his interview as though the show has paused due to internet lag, but he's actually still live. He then breaks his pause and says, "You're not buffering." .

In 2012, Pollak began a new podcast called Talkin Walkin in which he spends an hour or more with a new guest in character as Christopher Walken. After three episodes, the show was rated in the top 5 of all comedy podcasts by iTunes.

He is the only person to ever go "2 for 2" (two exact matches), as a guest on the Sklar Brothers/Daniel Van Kirk podcast Dumb People Town, in the "Guess the Age" game.  The feat was completed on the episode released on April 2, 2018.

In 2018, Pollak began hosting a comedy improvisation podcast called Alchemy This, on the network iHeartRadio. It features a regular cast of 5 members, Craig Cackowski, James Heaney, Chris Alvarado, Vanessa Ragland, and Joey Greer, as well as several guests.

Poker 
Pollak is an avid poker player. He finished 134th out of 6,598 entrants in the 2012 World Series of Poker and won $52,718. He also hosts weekly home games with Hollywood celebrities.

Personal life
In 1995, Pollak married comedian Lucy Webb. They separated in 2005 and divorced in 2008.

Filmography

Film

Television

Web

Awards and nominations

Book

References

External links
 
 
 

1957 births
20th-century American male actors
21st-century American male actors
American game show hosts
American impressionists (entertainers)
American male film actors
American podcasters
American stand-up comedians
Comedians from California
Comedians from Illinois
Jewish American male actors
Jewish American comedians
Living people
Male actors from Chicago
Male actors from San Francisco
Poker commentators
San Jose State University alumni
20th-century American comedians
21st-century American comedians
Jewish American male comedians
21st-century American Jews